Szostaki may refer to the following places:
Szostaki, Biała Podlaska County in Lublin Voivodeship (east Poland)
Szostaki, Biłgoraj County in Lublin Voivodeship (east Poland)
Szostaki, Łomża County in Podlaskie Voivodeship (north-east Poland)
Szostaki, Sokółka County in Podlaskie Voivodeship (north-east Poland)
Szostaki, Greater Poland Voivodeship (west-central Poland)
Szóstaki, Świętokrzyskie Voivodeship (south-central Poland)